Campbell Whyte was a Scottish footballer of the 1920s and 1930s.  He played in Scotland for Cowdenbeath and Third Lanark and in England for Gillingham, Northampton Town and Rochdale.  He made 29 Football League appearances.

References

People from Lochgelly
Scottish footballers
Cowdenbeath F.C. players
Third Lanark A.C. players
Northampton Town F.C. players
Gillingham F.C. players
Rochdale A.F.C. players
Association football outside forwards